These are the official results of the Women's 400 metres Hurdles event at the 1987 IAAF World Championships in Rome, Italy. There were a total number of 35 participating athletes, with five qualifying heats, two semi-finals and the final held on Thursday 1987-09-03.

Final

Semi-finals
 Held on Tuesday 1987-09-01

Qualifying heats
 Held on Monday 1987-08-31

See also
 1984 Women's Olympic 400m Hurdles (Los Angeles)
 1986 Women's European Championships 400m Hurdles (Stuttgart)
 1988 Women's Olympic 400m Hurdles (Seoul)
 1990 Women's European Championships 400m Hurdles (Split)

References
 Results

H
400 metres hurdles at the World Athletics Championships
1987 in women's athletics